Cholpon is a village in the Ak-Suu District of Issyk-Kul Region of Kyrgyzstan. Its population was 1,687 in 2021.

References 

Populated places in Issyk-Kul Region